This list of television awards is a index to articles on notable awards that are given to television shows in different countries and categories.
The list is organized by region and country. Typically the awards are given only for local productions.
Screenwriting awards for television are included in the separate list of writing awards.

Africa

 List of South African Film and Television Award categories
 South African Film and Television Awards

Americas

Canada

Latin America

United States

Asia

Europe

Oceania

See also
 List of film awards
 Lists of awards
 List of awards for supporting actor
 List of writing awards#Screenwriting awards for television

References